An Augusteum (plural Augustea) was originally a site of imperial cult in ancient Roman religion, named after the imperial title of Augustus. It was known as a Sebasteion in the Greek East of the Roman Empire. Examples have been excavated in Sebaste/Samaria, Constantinople, Aphrodisias, Antioch, Cartagena and (most famously) Ankara (Temple of Augustus and Rome).
 
Since the 18th century, the term has also been used for certain academic and cultural buildings, such as the Augustea in Leipzig, Oldenburg and Wittenberg.

See also
 Mausoleum of Augustus, Rome

References